Futi Corridor in Mozambique, is a corridor of land along the Futi River to the South African border. The corridor will effectively restore an historical migration and movement route of a valuable elephant population between Maputo Special Reserve and the Tembe Elephant Park in South Africa. The Futi Corridor covers 68.800 Ha. The Futi River is the northern extension of the drainage line known as the Mosi Swamp, which rises near Manaba about 55 km south of the border. The Futi River does not reach the sea, but ends in swamp grasslands in the north of the Maputo Reserve.

The reserve will eventually form part of the Lubombo Transfrontier Conservation Area, which includes national parks from South Africa, Mozambique and Eswatini. At the moment it forms part of the Usuthu-Tembe-Futi Transfrontier Conservation Area.

World Wide Fund for Nature has financed a 26 km electrified stay line to keep the Elephants away from farmlands.

References 
 

Nature conservation in Mozambique
Maputaland coastal forest mosaic
Protected areas of Mozambique